Llangynfelyn  is both a parish and a community in Ceredigion, Wales, midway between Aberystwyth and Machynlleth. The population in 2001 was 641 and 587 at the 2011 Census . The parish includes Llangynfelyn, Tre-Taliesin, Tre'r Ddôl and Craig y Penrhyn. The parish is named after the parish church of St Cynfelyn.

Various alternate spellings are used, particularly Llancynfelyn and Llancynfelin. 

Llangynfelyn Community Council (Cyngor Cymuned Llangynfelyn) serves the communities of Llangynfelyn, Tre'r Ddol and Tre'r Taliesin. The Council currently has nine members and meets monthly. Llangynfelyn Community Council is part of the Ceulanamaesmawr Ward. Catrin M S Davies was elected as the County Councillor for the Ceulanamaesmawr County Councillor in May 2022.

Tre'r Ddôl
Soar Chapel in Tre'r Ddôl was formerly the site of the Hen Gapel (Old Chapel) Museum, a branch of the Welsh National Folk Museum which closed in the 1990s. The museum was originally created in the late 1960s by the academic R J Thomas, editor of the Geiriadur Prifysgol Cymru. Soar Chapel was chosen for its links with Humphrey Rowland Jones (1832–1895), who had begun the 1858–60 Welsh revival there.
The poet and farmer, Dic Jones, and the writer Elma Mary Williams were born in Tre'r Ddôl. (link says Birmingham?)

References

External links
Parish history

Communities in Ceredigion
Villages in Ceredigion